State Road 330 (NM 330) is a  state highway in the US state of New Mexico. NM 330's southern terminus is at U.S. Route 70 (US 70) and NM 114 in Elida, and the eastern terminus is at NM 267 west of Floyd.

Major intersections

See also

References

330
Transportation in Roosevelt County, New Mexico